Anna Habersham Colquitt Hunter (January 21, 1892 – January 28, 1985) was an American preservationist, one of the founders of Historic Savannah Foundation in 1955.

Early life
Hunter was a descendant of James Habersham (1712–1775), a pioneering merchant and statesman in the British North American colony of Georgia. She was born in Savannah, Georgia, on January 21, 1892, but also grew up in South Carolina.

She was a graduate of Agnes Scott College, but left to marry George Lewis Cope Hunter, son of James Henry Hunter and Harriet Cope,A History of the Glen Family of South Carolina and Georgia – University of Wisconsin-Madison, Books on Demand (1923), p. 65  who was a student of agriculture at the University of Georgia in Athens, Georgia. He was registered as a student in 1908.

George died in 1936, aged 44, leaving his widow with three children to support.

Career
After her husband's death, Hunter began working for the Savannah Morning News and the Savannah Evening Press as a reporter, columnist and editor.

During World War II, she served as a Red Cross field director, serving in North Africa and Italy.

After the war, she performed as a dancer and singer, taking her to New York City in addition to dates in the South.

Historic Savannah Foundation

In 1954, Savannah's popular City Market in Ellis Square was demolished to be replaced by a parking garage, prompting a public outcry. The following year, a funeral home was set to purchase the Isaiah Davenport House in Columbia Square and tear it down for a parking lot. This sparked a movement to start a preservation process in the city.

Hunter formed a group with six of her friends to block the demolition of the house and formed the Historic Savannah Foundation. The group managed to raise the $22,500 needed to purchase the property themselves.

Death
Hunter died on January 28, 1985, aged 93. She is buried with her husband, who she survived by 49 years, in Savannah's Bonaventure Cemetery.

References

External links
"Savannah historic preservation movement founder Anna Hunter recognized by new book, opera" – Savannah Morning News, October 28, 2017
Obituary – Savannah Morning News, January 29, 1985
Anna Habersham Hunter Colquitt – Find a Grave

1892 births
1985 deaths
Writers from Savannah, Georgia
Agnes Scott College alumni
American women historians
American women writers
Historical preservationists